The Great Craggy Mountains, commonly called the Craggies, are a mountain range in western North Carolina, United States.  They are a subrange of the Blue Ridge Mountains and encompass an area of approx. 194 sq mi (503 km²). They are situated in Buncombe County, North Carolina, 14 miles northeast of Asheville. The Black Mountains lie to the northeast, across the upper Cane River valley.

The Blue Ridge Parkway runs along the crest for most of the way between Asheville and Mount Mitchell.  Craggy Gardens, an area of 16 km, is covered with purple Catawba rhododendrons in mid-June. The Craggy Pinnacle Overlook trail is a moderate .73 mile hike to a stone wall overlook with 360 degree views. The parking area for the trail is at milepost 361.2 on the Blue Ridge Parkway. 

The parkway through the area was closed from late 2012 through early 2013 due to subsidence caused by heavy rains, and had to be closed again during summer 2013 due to a reoccurrence of the same issues.  Access to Mount Mitchell was only from the north or via detour from the south.

Habitat
The high slopes of the Great Craggies are dominated by heath bald with rhododendron and blueberry, and northern hardwood forest with beech, buckeye, mountain ash, and red oak. The Craggies are in the Pisgah National Forest.

Peaks

See also
List of mountains in North Carolina

Sources

 
 Great Craggy Mountains description

External links

 Trails Near Asheville
 Mountains in 2001

Mountains, Great Craggy
Protected areas of Buncombe County, North Carolina
Blue Ridge Mountains
Blue Ridge Parkway
Mountain ranges of North Carolina
Mountains of Buncombe County, North Carolina